Armigeres (Leicesteria) omissus is a species complex of zoophilic mosquito belonging to the genus Armigeres. It is found in Sri Lanka, India, Nepal, Indonesia, Malaysia, Taiwan, Thailand, Bangladesh, Philippines, Cambodia and China.

References

External links
Description of the pupa of Armigeres (Leicesteria) omissus (Edwards) and a key to the larvae and pupae of the Armigeres occurring in Nepal (Diptera: Culicidae)
Leicesteria Theobald, 1904 - Mosquito Taxonomic Inventory

omissus
Insects described in 1914